Sharp Daily is a Chinese-language free daily tabloid newspaper, published in Taipei, Taiwan, and previously in Hong Kong, by Next Digital.

Taiwan edition 
Launched on 24 October 2006 as a rival to Cola News (可樂新聞 Pinyin:Kělèxinwen), another free tabloid, published by United Daily News, Sharp Daily shares news content with the Taiwanese Apple Daily. According to Forbes each copy costs 2.8 New Taiwan dollars to produce and its target readership is "the train-riding working class"

Hong Kong edition
Sharp Daily was launched in Hong Kong on 19 September 2011 with a stated aim of 1 million copies per day. It was also the first free tabloid newspaper in Hong Kong to have an evening edition, although this was dropped in March 2012. The Hong Kong edition of Sharp Daily was closed down on 21 October 2013 after the owner Jimmy Lai revealed that the newspaper had lost several hundred millions of Hong Kong dollars in two years.

Notes

References 

Translation:
Pinyin translated with CozyChinese.COM

External links

Sharp Daily Taiwan
Sharp Daily Hong Kong
Next Digital

Newspapers published in Taiwan
Chinese-language newspapers (Traditional Chinese)
Next Digital
Mass media in Taipei
2006 establishments in Taiwan
Publications established in 2006